Henry Marsh may refer to:

 Henry Marsh (naval officer) (d. 1772)), English naval officer
Sir Henry Marsh, 1st Baronet (1790–1860), Irish surgeon
Henry Marsh (runner) (born 1954), American Olympic steeplechase runner
Henry Marsh (bishop) (1898–1995), Anglican bishop in Canada
Henry Marsh (musician) (born 1948), British pop musician
Henry Marsh (neurosurgeon) (born 1950), British neurosurgeon
Henry Marsh (rugby union) (1850–1939), England rugby union international
Henry Alan Marsh (1901–1950), British rotary aircraft test pilot and manager of Cierva Autogiro Company
Henry A. Marsh (1836–1914), American banker and mayor of Worcester, Massachusetts
Henry G. Marsh (1921–2011), mayor of Saginaw, Michigan
Henry L. Marsh (born 1933), American politician and civil rights lawyer
Henry W. Marsh (1860–1943), American insurance executive and co-founder of Marsh McLennan